Bromfield is a surname. Notable people with the surname include:

 Andrew Bromfield (fl. 2000s–2020s), British translator
 Arthur Bromfield (d. 1650), English politician
 Beatrice Bromfield (c. 1880–1966), Australian-born American art dealer
 Dionne Bromfield (born 1996), English singer
 Edmund de Bromfield (d. 1393), English bishop of Llandaff
 Edward Bromfield (fl. 1620s–1630s), Lord Mayor of London in 1636
 Harry Bromfield (born 1932), South African cricketer
 Henry Bromfield (1610–1683), English politician
 John Bromfield (1922–2005), American actor
 John Bromfield Jr. (1779–1849), American merchant
 Joseph Bromfield (1744–1824), English architect
 Lois Bromfield (fl. 1980s–2000s), Canadian comedic actress
 Louis Bromfield (1896–1956), American author
 Mary Ellen Bromfield (b. 1928), American actress
 Rex Bromfield (fl. 1970s–2000s), Canadian director
 Richard Bromfield (fl. 1990s–2000s), psychologist
 Robert Bromfield (d. 1647), English merchant and politician
 Valri Bromfield (born 1949), Canadian comedian
 Walter H. C. Bromfield (1884–1963), Australian philatelist
 William Bromfield (1868–1950), English trade unionist and Labour Party Member of Parliament
 William Arnold Bromfield (1801–1851), English botanist

See also 
 Bromfield baronets
 Bromfield (disambiguation)

English-language surnames